The Middleman and Other Stories (1988) is a collection of short stories by Bharati Mukherjee.  Stories from this volume are frequently anthologized, particularly Orbiting, A Wife's Story, and The Middleman.  The short story Jasmine would later be developed into the 1989 novel Jasmine.

Contents

Reception
 Selected as a New York Times Book Review notable book of the year.
 National Book Critics Circle Award.
 The story The Tenant appeared in The Best American Short Stories 1987.

References

External links
The Middleman and Other Stories at google books
Powells book review

1988 short story collections
Asian-American short story collections
American short story collections
Short story collections by Bharati Mukherjee
National Book Critics Circle Award-winning works
Grove Press books
Air India Flight 182